Ironwood Forest National Monument is located in the Sonoran Desert of Arizona. Created by Bill Clinton by Presidential Proclamation 7320 on June 9, 2000, the monument is managed by the Bureau of Land Management, an agency within the United States Department of the Interior.

A significant concentration of ironwood (also known as desert ironwood, Olneya tesota) trees is found in the monument, along with two federally recognized endangered animal and plant species. More than 200 Hohokam archaeological sites have been identified in the monument, dated between 600 and 1450.

Flora and fauna

Flora

An array of flora are present in the Ironwood Forest National Monument. The lower elevations are in the Sonoran Desert ecoregion. One of the notable trees native here is the elephant tree (Bursera microphylla). Small populations of the endangered Nichols turk's head cactus, although not found among ironwood trees, occur in very localized limestone-rich areas within the monument.

Ironwood trees
The desert ironwood (Olneya tesota) is a very long-lived tree, with some specimens estimated to be more than 800 years old. Desert ironwood is a keystone species because it provides a nursery environment of shade and protection that enables young seedlings of other species to become established despite the harsh desert climate, where daytime high temperatures can exceed . The ironwood also provides shade and roosting area habitats for birds. Its smoky lavender-colored blossoms provide nectar for bees and other insects, as well as forage for animals. The blossoms produce bean pods which also provide food for desert animals.

Prehistoric ecology
Lists of dominant plants in the prehistoric ecology and plant community of the Waterman Mountains area in the monument have been published in a sequence that currently dates back to the last glacial period, the Late Wisconsin glacial period. Dominant trees of that era, based upon pollen records, were Utah juniper (Juniperus osteosperma), single-leaf pinyon (Pinus monophylla), and redberry juniper (Juniperus pinchotii), and understory plants included Monardella arizonica.

Fauna

According to Proclamation 7320, 674 plant and animal species have been identified in the Silver Bell Mountains within the monument, including 64 species of mammals and 57 species of birds, although the Bureau of Land Management has been unable to verify those claims.  Recent studies by the Arizona-Sonora Desert Museum, however, have documented 560 plant species.  Resident birdwatchers have documented more than 80 species of migratory and non-migratory birds.

One specimen of the endangered lesser long-nosed bat (Leptonycteris curasoae) and a night roost were documented within the monument by bat researchers Karen Krebbs and Yar Petryszyn. They concluded that while the monument may be an important feeding stopover during spring migrations, the presence of L. curasoae in the monument is probably low or incidental.

The Arizona desert bighorn sheep herd located within the monument is the last remaining relict population of desert bighorn sheep in southeastern Arizona, having first migrated into North America during the Pleistocene epoch.

History
The Hohokam people were the first miners in the area.  They mined turquoise in the Silver Bell Mountains. Silver and copper mining began in the Silver Bell Mountains around 1850 and continues today. Bighorn sheep ewes prefer mine tailings for lambing grounds because the high, steep and open terrain enables them to see and escape from predators.

Activities
The Ironwood Forest National Monument is managed for multiple uses including recreation, cattle grazing and mining, although new mining claims and motorized off-road travel are prohibited by the establishing Proclamation. Domestic sheep and goats are prohibited as a protection to the bighorn sheep. The monument offers almost no surface water but contains sufficient groundwater resources.

The cattle ranchers maintain more than 80 individual man-made water sources within the monument, in addition to the 14 water sources maintained by the Arizona Game and Fish Department and the Arizona Desert Bighorn Sheep Society. The presence of human-supplied water supports the exceptional abundance of birds, mule deer, coyotes, foxes, bobcats, mountain lions and other wildlife found in the monument.

Gallery

See also

 List of national monuments of the United States
 Santa Ana del Chiquiburitac Mission Site
 Silver Bell Mountains
 Waterman Mountains
 Saguaro National Park
 Tucson artifacts

References

External links

 
 
 
 
 
 Friends of Ironwood Forest, a nonprofit organization partnering with BLM to protect Ironwood Forest National Monument by providing volunteer service, advocacy, and visitor education.
 Arizona Desert Bighorn Sheep Society, a nonprofit organization committed to increasing bighorn sheep populations in Arizona
 

National Monuments in Arizona
Bureau of Land Management National Monuments
Bureau of Land Management areas in Arizona
Protected areas of Pima County, Arizona
Protected areas of Pinal County, Arizona
Protected areas of the Sonoran Desert
2000 establishments in Arizona
Protected areas established in 2000
Units of the National Landscape Conservation System